Unterschleißheim station is a railway station in the town of Unterschleißheim, located in the Munich district in Upper Bavaria, Bavaria, Germany.

References

External links

Munich S-Bahn stations
Buildings and structures in Munich (district)
Railway stations in Germany opened in 1977
1977 establishments in West Germany